The Qube may refer to one of two buildings:

The Qube (Vancouver), a distinctive "hanging" building in British Columbia, Canada
The Qube (Detroit), formerly the Chase Tower and Bank One, a financial center in Michigan, United States

See also 
 Qube (disambiguation)